The Tupchi-bashi ("head of the tupchis") was the commander of the Safavid Empire's  artillery corps. He was responsible for the artillery battery (tup-khaneh) and needed materials in relation to the artillery pieces as well. The tupchi-bashi received assistance by an administrative staff, as well as by various officers of lower rank. The term tupchi-bashi was also used to designate the commanders of local artillery batteries in the various cities and provinces of the empire.

List of Tupchi-bashis

Reign of Ismail I
 Hamza Beg (1507)
 Mahmud Beg (1516)

Reign of Tahmasp I
 Ostad Sheikhi Beg (1528-1529)
 Sheikh Ali (1538-1539)
 Darvish Beg (1551-1552)
 Soleiman Beg (1556-1557)

Reign of Mohammad Khodabanda
 Morad Khan (1580-1581)

Reign of Abbas I
 Qoreiqchi Khan (1605-1606)
 Barkhordar Beg (1610)

Reign of Safi
 Mortezaqoli Beg (1637-1638)
 Morad Beg (1642)

Reign of Abbas II
 Morad Beg (1642)
 Mohammad Beg (1649)
 Hoseinqoli Khan (1655) 
 Qalandar Soltan Chuleh Chaghatay (1660-1661)

Reign of Suleiman I
 Najafqoli Beg (1669-1679)
 Mohammad Hosein Beg (1679-?)
 Musa Beg (1692)
 Abd ol-Razzaq Beg (1693-1695)

Reign of Sultan Husayn
 Abd ol-Razzaq Beg (1693-1695)
 Abdi Aqa (1697-1698)
 Aliqoli Khan (1711-1714)
 Mohebb-Ali Khan (1716-1721)
 Ahmad Khan (1721)
 Mohammad-Ali Khan (1722)
 His son (1722)

Reign of Tahmasp II
 Emin Khan (1728-1729)
 Taher Beg (1730-1731)
 Mohammadqoli Khan (1731-1732)
 Yar Beg Khan (1732)

Reign of Abbas III
 Yar Beg Khan (1732)
 Mehdi Khan (1733)

Notes

Sources
 
 
 

Tupchi-bashi
Iranian military-related lists
Lists of office-holders in Iran